Philip 'Pip' J Branfield (born 1952) is a former English international lawn bowler.

Bowls career
Branfield became a National champion in 1984 when he won the national Championship triples for Clevedon and Somerset. The winning team consisted of his father Len Branfield and Gordon James. A second national title arrived 24 years later when he was part of the fours team that won the 2008 National title; remarkably the team included his son James Branfield in addition to Darren Mason and John Hick, which meant he had been a National champion with both his father and son.

He was an England international from 1979 until 1991.

He was selected for England in the fours, at the 1986 Commonwealth Games in Edinburgh, Scotland and was a team manager for the 2010 Commonwealth Games.

Family
His daughter is England international bowler Stef Branfield.

References

1952 births
Living people
English male bowls players
Bowls players at the 1986 Commonwealth Games
Commonwealth Games competitors for England